Nacheaux is a Mexican-Cajun fusion restaurant in West Linn, Oregon. Previously, the business operated in Portland.

Description
Nacheaux is a Black-owned restaurant in West Linn, which previously operated in Portland. The menu features Mexican-Cajun cuisine, including fried-chicken crunch wraps, churro beignets, macaroni and cheese with seafood, and nachos. KGW's Christine Pitawanich described the menu as "Mexican/southern fusion", offering Cinnamon Toast Crunch cheesecake and fried chicken enchiladas. The menu also includes carnitas, catfish, red beans and rice, and tacos.

History
Anthony and Stephanie Brown opened Nacheaux as a food cart in southeast Portland's Cartlandia pod in March 2020, during the COVID-19 pandemic. Anthony also serves as chef.

The food cart closed in February 2021 and began operating as a brick and mortar restaurant in northeast Portland's Cully neighborhood in March.

In 2022, the business closed temporarily to relocated to West Linn. Nacheaux reopened on July 27.

Reception
In 2021, Portland Monthly Katherine Chew Hamilton included Nacheaux in a list of "The 8 Most Mouthwatering Nachos to Try in Portland".

See also

 List of Black-owned restaurants
 List of Cajun restaurants
 List of Mexican restaurants
 List of Southern restaurants

References

External links

 

2020 establishments in Oregon
Black-owned restaurants in the United States
Cajun restaurants in the United States
Cully, Portland, Oregon
Food carts in Portland, Oregon
Mexican restaurants in Oregon
Mexican restaurants in Portland, Oregon
Restaurants established in 2020
Southern restaurants
West Linn, Oregon